Final Battle 2012: Doomsday was the 11th ROH Final Battle professional wrestling internet pay-per-view (iPPV) event produced by Ring of Honor (ROH). It took place on December 16, 2012 at the Hammerstein Ballroom in New York, New York.

Storylines
Final Battle 2012: Doomsday featured professional wrestling matches which involved different wrestlers from pre-existing scripted feuds, plots, and storylines that played out on ROH's television programs. Wrestlers portrayed villains or heroes as they followed a series of events that built tension and culminated in a wrestling match or series of matches.

Results

See also
List of Ring of Honor pay-per-view events

References

External links
ROH website

Ring of Honor pay-per-view events
Events in New York City
2012 in New York City
December 2012 events in the United States
2012
Professional wrestling in New York City
2012 Ring of Honor pay-per-view events